Charles Ceccaldi-Raynaud (25 June 1925 – 18 July 2019) was a French lawyer and politician. He served as a member of the National Assembly from 1993 to 1995, and the Senate from 1995 to 2004, representing Hauts-de-Seine. He was the author of a book about the Algerian War.

Works

http://charlesceccaldiraynaud.com

References

1925 births
2019 deaths
People from Bastia
Corsican politicians
French Section of the Workers' International politicians
Social Democratic Party (France) politicians
Rally for the Republic politicians
Deputies of the 10th National Assembly of the French Fifth Republic
French Senators of the Fifth Republic
Senators of Hauts-de-Seine
Mayors of places in Île-de-France
French non-fiction writers